Thorndon may refer to:

People
 Giles Thorndon (1388–1477), official of the English Crown
 Robin Cooke, Baron Cooke of Thorndon (1926–2006), New Zealand judge and member of the British House of Lords

Buildings and places
New Zealand
 Thorndon, New Zealand, suburb of Wellington
 Thorndon Railway Station, former railway station
 Thorndon School, primary and intermediate school
 Thorndon (New Zealand electorate), New Zealand general electorate

United Kingdom
 Aspall and Thorndon railway station, former railway station on the Mid-Suffolk Light Railway
 Thorndon Hall, Georgian Palladian country house in Ingrave, Essex
 Thorndon Park Chapel,  former Roman Catholic private chapel in the grounds of Thorndon Hall
 Thorndon, Suffolk, village and civil parish in Suffolk

Other
 Thorndon Mile, Thoroughbred horse race in Wellington, New Zealand